Sun Peaks Resort is an alpine ski resort located in Sun Peaks, British Columbia, Canada,  northeast of Kamloops.

Sun Peaks area averages over 2000 hours of sun a year.

The resort has 13 lifts with a total capacity of 13,400 riders per hour, with the Burfield chair being the longest at 23 minutes total ride. The ski area comprises three mountains: Tod Mountain, Sundance Mountain, and Mt. Morrisey.

History

Indigenous history 
Sun Peaks is located in a larger historical region whose original Indigenous inhabitants were the Secwepemc. Its location was later included in the Neskonlith Douglas Reserve, set out by the first governor of B.C. James Douglas in 1862; though a related land claim was rejected by the federal government in the late 1990s.

The founding of Tod Mountain Resort
In 1958, skiing pioneers Donald Whyte and Donald Munro were making the commute back from the Silver Star ski resort in Vernon. This was a common procedure for skiers living in Kamloops, as, although there was much land to capitalize upon, there was only one very small ski hill in the area (Lac Le Jeune Ski Ranch, which opened in 1947).
 
On the drive back, the two gleaned a direct view of Tod Mountain from a point on Highway 97 near where it meets Barnhartvale Road, above its junction with Highway 1. After examining the terrain from afar, the pair concluded that there were ample skiing opportunities to be had in the mountains northeast of Kamloops. On 9 May 1959, both paid a visit to the village of Whitecroft, at the base of Tod Mountain. On 16 May, Munro, Whyte, lawyer Reginald Humphreys, ski resort operator Sam Warmington, and doctor James Osborne once again drove to Whitecroft. A nearby ranch owner rented the men horses and led them up the towering peak. An hour and a half after setting off, the party reached what is now known as the West Bowl, on the northwestern side of Tod Mountain. The group spent two nights in a shepherd's cabin. Once they set out again, they trekked to the crest of Tod Mountain, now known as the Top of the World (the location of the current Burfield and Crystal chairlift top terminals). Ahead of them lay the Crystal Bowl, pristine and bearing ideal geological features for a chairlift and ski resort.
 
On 29 May 1959, Tod Mountain Ski Resort Ltd. and Tod Mountain Ski Village Ltd. were incorporated. Through the summer of 1960, the small range road  between Heffley Creek on Highway 5 and Whitecroft was improved to two lanes, and a new road was constructed from the Whitecroft valley up to the foot of Tod Mountain. In early 1961, construction commenced on the original Burfield (at the time called Tod Mountain Ski Lift) chairlift. Constructed in Vancouver by Murray-Latta, surveying and design was carried out by Robert McLellan of McLellan and Co.. Bregoliss Construction, based in Kamloops, was awarded the contract for clearing of the runs and lift line, construction of the top, midstation, and bottom terminals, and the erecting of the lift poles. Munro was appointed President of the two resort companies.
 
On 18 November 1961 the Tod Mountain ski resort finally opened to the general public. The original chairlift was a double-person capacity, 9,300 foot diesel powered system boasting a capacity of 400 people/hour. At the time, it was the longest chairlift in the entirety of North America. Five runs had been cut: Crystal Bowl, Ridge, 5 Mile, Chief, and the latter half of what is now known as 7 Mile Road.

Closure of the resort 1968–1970
In July 1968, seven years after the opening day, a crew was conducting maintenance work on the top terminal of the Tod Mountain Ski Lift, when a spark from a welding job flew into the sump pump, causing the wooden building housing the machinery to alight. The fire ignited the diesel drive which was directly linked to the bullwheel, causing the entire lift line to part from the wheel, dropping to the ground. Although the weight of the chairs dragging and colliding with the ground and obstacles arrested the motion of the rampant lift cable somewhat, significant damage was inflicted upon the lift. Repairs and insurance matters prevented the re-opening of the resort until the 1970–1971 ski season.

Acquisition by Highland Development
In December 1969, Highland Development, owned by Drake Cummings, purchased all shares of both resort companies. The company took responsibility for Tod Mountain Resort's expenses, and intended to develop a division of Highland Development upon the mountain. The original cost proposed by the company was $750,000 (approximately $5,126,865 CAD in 2021). Cummings' goal was to transition Tod Mountain into a year-round venture, providing activities for citizens and visitors throughout the summer months as well as the traditional winter portion. Highland Development's first goal was to repair the incapacitated Tod Mountain chairlift. Once again, this task's contract was awarded to Bregoliss Construction, and by the summer of 1970, the chair was operational once again. The cost for this task as well as routine maintenance and the spiffing-up of facilities was $200,000 (approximately $1,367,164 CAD in 2021). 

Cummings hired Mel Borgeson as a consultant for future development. In May 1970, his report detailed the possible building of a 40-acre village at the base of the chairlift, a ski lodge midway up the hill, and strongly suggested that another chairlift be constructed farther east of the current lift. In late 1970, plans were proposed to build this new chairlift and Bob Forrester, an engineer and surveyor working for the Whistler ski resort at the time was hired as director for this project.

Death of Harry Burfield
On 12 June 1971, Harry Burfield, a prominent ski racer/jumper who was a pioneer of the Tod Mountain ski area and had constructed and operated a lodge/shop, boarded a Cessna 180 light aircraft and took off on a sightseeing journey for the benefit of Wolfgang Ehmann, a passenger, who was intrigued in investing in the resort. The plane was piloted by Harold Palmer, and other than Burfield and Ehmann, had onboard one more passenger, Ehmann's partner, Christine Saunders.
 
During a sharp 30-degree right-hand maneuver, the plane crashed on the northwest side of Tod Mountain, at around 6,500 feet. All on board were killed instantly. "Harry's Run", a run stemming off the present day West Bowl network, is cut near the crash site. 
 
In his honor, the lodge he previously operated and the Tod Mountain chairlift were renamed to the Burfield Lodge and the Burfield Chair, respectively.

Construction of the Shuswap Chairlift and expansion east
In the summer of 1972, after lengthy planning, the Shuswap Chairlift was installed. Like the Burfield, it was a two-person chair. The base of the chair was located near where the current Sun Peaks Alpine Club building stands. Cariboo and Cahilty were new runs cut, both of which connected to the original 5 Mile, which now ran to the bottom. Exhibition was the run cut below the lift line. A road-like flat run connected the summit of the Shuswap Chair and the Midstation of the Burfield Chair. The new chair was in operation for the 1972–73 ski season. This development marked the start of the eastwards push for the resort, which eventually resulted in the modern-day facilities currently in operation (the village and main chairlift center).

Divestment of Highland Developments and financial struggles
By the end of 1972, Highland Developments expressed their intentions to disassociate themselves with the Tod Mountain group. After the breakup, Petric Recreation Co., owned by Rick Robertson and Peter MacKay-Smith and Klapstock Holdings, owned by Ernest Klapstock, formed Tod Mountain Recreation Ltd., and the two companies apportioned equal shares. Peter Pocklington, the then-owner of the Edmonton Oilers hockey team, purchased Klapstock Holdings' shares in 1974, which instilled hope in the financially struggling community and consortium. Yet, because much of Pocklington's money was being diverted to the Oilers hockey team, only a small percentage of his total cash was being allocated to Tod Mountain. However, due to Pocklington's prominent standing amongst the bureaucracy, the Royal Bank of Canada loaned him and Petric Recreation Co., which enabled Tod Mountain to maintain their status until the 1976–77 season. Then, already on a shaky financial basis, the snow levels flunked. With virtually no snow and an extremely late season start, the Royal Bank cancelled the loans. On 20 December 1976, Tod Mountain ski resort entered a voluntary receivership status. The following two seasons (1976–77, 1977–78) seasons followed suit, until in mid-1978 Tod Mountain was disposed of by the Royal Bank. The highest bidder, a private group of businessmen based in Calgary, bought the resort and its holdings on 19 October 1978. The resort was renamed Tod Mountain Developments Ltd.

Reconciliation and revamping of facilities
In the summer of 1979, the new owners announced their master plan: a massive $10 million project which would see the mountain receive an 18-hole golf course, a large (300 acre) village, community tennis/basketball courts, a new warming lodge midway up the slopes, but most relevant at the time, a brand new chairlift. During the summer of that same year, the Crystal Chairlift was installed east of the Burfield, with its bottom terminal at a similar elevation to the summit of the Shuswap Chair. This new three-person fixed-grip lift was manufactured by Doppelmayr and ran along the east ridge of the Crystal Bowl. It was in operation for the 1979–80 ski season.

In the late months of 1980, allegations from unnamed sources pummeled Tod Mountain, citing that the company could no longer manage to pay its employees. This evoked rumors questioning if the resort would even open for the 1980–81 season. Luckily, Tod Mountain Developments Ltd. had begun selling their package and advertising the resort as a prime location for the Pacific Western Airlines (PWA) Pro Ski Tour. Starting in 1980 through to 1984, Tod Mountain was a regular stop on the calendar. At the same time, Masters races, sanctioned by the Canadian Masters National Alpine program, began to be held at Tod Mountain in 1986. In the mid-1980s, the Headwalls run became the chosen course for the annual Velocity Challenge.  In this event, skiers "tuck" into a special, aerodynamic position and ski down the daunting, black-diamond difficulty Headwalls Run. Speeds of up to 175 km/h (109 mph) are reached. The last time the event was held was in 2018. These three main events which commenced in the 1980s not only helped to keep the resort afloat, but also boosted the reputation of Tod Mountain.

Throughout the 1980s, a noticeable shift in main operations had been transpiring. The base of the Shuswap Chair, the proposed site of the eventual village, was quickly becoming the "place to be". After the road was extended past the base of the Burfield chair to the base of the Shuswap in 1982, the "restaurant" quickly gained popularity as a food supplier. A rental shop and the relocated ski school also formed up near the chairlift. 5 Mile (then referred to as Dynamite), the run from the top of the Burfield/Crystal chairs to the base of the Shuswap Chair, gained popularity. Between 1986 and 1989, almost 10 entirely new runs, branching from the top of the Shuswap Chair, were cut and another 20 were flagged as future development.

On December 24, 1989, a fire broke out in the engine room of the Crystal Chairlift. Fred Ahrweiler, the head of Mechanical Engineering and head lift operator, received the news the next day. However, by February 1990, the Crystal Chair was running once more thanks to the tireless work of Ahrweiler and his team.

New Ownership through Nippon Cable and expansions
However, by the end of the 1989–90 season, Tod Mountain Developments Ltd. was up for sale once more. Nippon Cable of Japan, partnered with Ecosign Co., purchased the resort in April 1992. In late 1992, the new owners held a renaming contest for the resort, using ballot boxes, as "Tod" in German translated to "Death". Over 2000 ballots were deposited. On 13 August 1993, the new name was announced: Sun Peaks Resort. In the summer of 1993, two chairlifts, the Sunburst Express (detachable system), replacing the aging Shuswap Chair, and the Sundance Chair, east of the Sunburst Chair, were installed, and the Exhibition T-Bar was transplanted to West Bowl, opening access to a diversity of new terrain. In 1994, the Tod Mountain Road was paved over its entire 33 km (21 mi) span, increasing the safety of the journey and cutting travel times from about 45 minutes to 25–30. In 1995, the Sundance Chair was extended and turned into an Express (detachable) lift. That same year, the village platter and Magic Carpet lifts were installed. In the summer of 1997, the old Burfield double chair was replaced by a Doppelmayr quad lift, using the old top terminal of the non-express Sundance chair as the bottom terminal for the new chair. Planning for a massive alpine village was started.

Many beginner facilities were constructed in an attempt to promote the mountain as a "family resort for all ages". Terrain was expanded enormously with the transplanting of the Exhibition T-Bar to the West Bowl and, primarily, the opening of Mount Morrisey in 2002, when a Doppelmayr high-speed quad was installed adjacent from Sundance Mountain, yielding many new runs and opportunities for future expansion, both residential and ski-wise. In 1999, the first trails for a massive network of summer bike paths were cut. Currently, the Sun Peaks bike park, serviced by the Sunburst Chair (half-converted to bike carrier chairs in the summer), boasts nearly 2,500 feet of vertical terrain, as well as ample beginner facilities, serviced by the Magic Carpet lift in the Village. Terrain varies from machined flowing cross-country trails to complete downhill singletracks. Sun Peaks Bike Park is a permanent fixture on the BC Downhill Cup Series and has hosted the BC Downhill Championships and the Canadian National DH Championships in the past. Since the late 1990s, Sun Peaks Resort has worked to extend a massive web of Nordic/Cross-Country ski trails. Today, the extensive paths stretch nearly 37km (23mi) around the resort, primarily Mount Morrisey. This is in addition to a luxurious 18-hole golf course (completed in 2005), a massive residential/guest oriented ski-in village, and many more amenities built under the guiding eye of Nippon Cable. 

In 2006, the Elevation Quad Chairlift was completed and opened for the 2006–07 season. Its base is midway down 5-Mile on a raised outcropping, and its summit is directly beside the top terminal of the Sunburst Express chairlift. This and further run-cutting opened up a brand-new race center. The Austrian National Ski Team signed a five-year contract in 2005 to train at Sun Peaks in preparation for the 2010 Olympics in Vancouver.

In 2014, the previously out-of-bounds area known as Gil's was added to the in-bounds area of the resort.

Secwepemc Resistance 
After the purchase of Sun Peaks by Nippon Cable in 1992, the NDP provincial government adopted a long-term development contract with Nippon without addressing Secwepemc Title Claims or obtaining Secwepemc consent. Nippon then initiated a 70 million dollar expansion plan that would clear-cut three more mountains (at the time Sun Peaks only encompassed two mountains), double the golf course, expand a drainage basin for commercial and residential real estate, and add over 24,000 more beds to the resort. In 1998 the Neskonlith Secwepemc people appealed to Masayoshi Ohkubo, then President of Sun Peaks Corporation, to respect their title and rights. They also appealed to the Federal Minister of Indian and Northern Affairs, Rover D. Nault, who claimed that the land dispute with Sun Peaks fell under provincial jurisdiction. 

Asserting that the Sun Peaks Resort undermined their ability to exercise their inherent rights to land-use and occupancy and constituted a violation of Aboriginal title, Secwepemc land defenders launched a years-long campaign to oppose Sun Peaks expansion in 1999. The campaign opposed Sun Peaks expansion, the 2010 Winter Olympics, and called for boycotts of both Sun Peaks Resort and Delta Hotels. Secwepemc land defenders argued that clearcut logging on three mountains to expand the resort ruined the habitats of deer, moose, bears, beavers, lynx, bobcat, cougars and wolverines; that traditional foods and medicines the Secwepemc have relied on no longer grew in the area; and that lakes and rivers had been polluted by chemicals used to make artificial snow and maintain golf courses.  

In 2000, land defenders established the first Skwelkwek'welt Protection Centre. In 2001, RCMP arrested a number of land defenders at the Secwepemc MacGillivray Lake village while enforcing a trespass order, including youth. Skwelkwek'welt Protection Centre spokesperson Janice Billy alleged that officers used excessive force on land defenders, including choking a youth, using pepper spray on youth, and injuring the arm of a young woman. In 2004, Indigenous leader George Manuel Jr. was arrested along with two other others by the RCMP, who were enforcing a court injunction ordering Indigenous activists and supporters to leave the area. The arrests were condemned by the Council of Canadians and Union of BC Indian Chiefs. Between 1999 and 2005, 54 Skewelkwek'welt land defenders were arrested. In addition to arrests, a traditional cedar bark lodge and cabin were burned down in 2001 and racist youth gangs incited violence against Indigenous youth in Chase in 2001.

In 2001 Neskonlith Indian Band Chief Arthur Manuel held negotiations with the province through BC Attorney General Geoff Plant, which Manuel explained as failing due to Plant insisting that the Skwelkwek'welt Protection Centre at Sun Peaks and land defence camp at McGillivray Lake be dismantled. 

In 2006, the land defenders' focus turned to the 2010 Winter Olympics and the Secwepemc Native Youth Movement launched an anti-Olympics campaign during the Canadian Masters Alpine Championships at Sun Peaks, calling for a boycott of Sun Peaks Resort and Delta Hotels. While Sun Peaks claimed to have no direct involvement in the upcoming Olympics, the youth campaign opposed the training of the Austrian Olympic ski team at the resort and protested Nancy Greene Raine's involvement in the resort. At the time Greene Raine's company, NGR Resort Consultants, was being protested by St'at'imc land defenders over the proposed Cayoosh Resort in the Cayoosh Mountain Range. The Secwepemc Native Youth Movement also protested the installation of Nancy Greene Raine as first chancellor of Thompson Rivers University in Kamloops.

Federal and provincial governments refused to acknowledge Secwepemc title in cases relating to the protests, which land defenders pointed out violated the Supreme Court of Canada's recognition of Aboriginal Title in the 1997 Delgamuukw Decision. In 2004, the British Columbia Supreme Court rejected the appeal of eight Secwepemc activists convicted of public mischief and intimidation, ruling that they did not possess a legal and traditional right to defend their territory despite never having relinquished the territory to either the provincial or federal governments by land claim or treaty. 

The anti-Sun Peaks campaign garnered national support, including from the Assembly of First Nations, KAIROS: Canadian Ecumenical Justice Initiative and Naomi Klein. In 2003, the Special Rapporteur of the United Nations High Commissioner for Human Rights visited the Skwelkwek'welt Protection Centre. Additionally, there were solidarity protests held in Germany.

Recent expansions 
On December 23, 2018, the new Orient fixed-grip quad chairlift opened adjacent to the Morrisey Express, greatly improving ski-back access from the Morrisey side of the resort and providing ski-in-ski-out access for hundreds of homes in the East Village, as well as opening up large possibilities for future expansion.

In the summer of 2020, a replacement for the 41-year-old Crystal three-person chair was built and was operational for the 2020–21 ski season. The new Crystal Quad boasts a 20% uphill capacity increase, and follows a slightly different line to the original Crystal, providing access to the Top Of The World from the Crystal chair, as opposed to solely from the Burfield.

After being "temporarily" disused for the 2020–21 season, the West Bowl T-Bar's official retirement was announced prior to the beginning of the 2021–22 ski season. In early 2022, Sun Peaks Resort started the application process for a new detachable (express) chairlift in the West Bowl. Over the summer of 2022, the entire lift line was cut, the bases for the bottom and top terminals were built, and substantial logging and run cutting went on below the current West Bowl skiing area. In addition, a new road was built from the future top terminal site to connect to 5 Mile and the rest of the mountain. Construction on the chairlift is expected to take place primarily over the summers of 2023 and 2024, and the 1.58 km (1 mi) chairlift is expected to be open for the 2024-25 ski season.

The Burfield chair is the longest fixed grip chairlift in North America, and is the 9th longest in travel length (.

Nancy Greene Raine is the Director of Skiing at the resort.

Downhill ski trails

Ski lifts

Sun Peaks has an all-Doppelmayr fleet of nine ski lifts on all three mountains, Tod, Sundance and Morrisey. Sun Peaks also has 3 magic carpets.

Removed ski lifts

Other facilities

Sun Peaks Mountain Bike Park
In addition to skiing, Sun Peaks also operates a downhill mountain bike park with over 2,000 vertical feet of terrain. The Sunburst Express quad chair takes riders to a trail park at the top.

Golf course
Sun Peaks has a 6,400 yard, 18-hole golf course.

Tubing
In 2003 Sun Peaks opened "Tube Time" to allow for recreational tubing at the resort.

Banked slalom
In 2016, a new permanent banked slalom course was opened alongside the Sundowner and Suncatcher runs.

Gallery

References

External links

 Sun Peaks Resort

Ski areas and resorts in British Columbia
Thompson Country
Monashee Mountains
1961 establishments in British Columbia